Amadade, is located in Bhadgaon Taluka, Jalgaon district, Maharashtra, India. It is one of big villages in Jalgaon district with political influence. It belongs to Khandesh region. It belongs to Nashik Division . It is located 51 km towards west from District headquarters Jalgaon; 7 km from Bhadgaon; 366 km from State capital Mumbai. 
 Amadade Pin code is 424105 and postal head office is Bhadgaon. In Amadade, there is very fertile soil due to River Girna. 
Cotton, Corn, Banana, Wheat , etc are the main crops cultivated in this area. 

Villages in Jalgaon district